Ashra may refer to:

 Ashra (band), a proto-trance group founded by Manuel Gottsching in 1976
 Ashra (All-sky Survey High Resolution Air-shower detector), a project of the Institute for Cosmic Ray Research

See also
Asherah, a Semitic mother goddess